Alhaji Mohammed Mubarak Muntaka is the Member of Parliament for Asawase in the Ashanti Region of Ghana of the 4th, 5th, 6th, 7th and the 8th parliaments of the 4th Republic of Ghana. Currently, he is the Minority Chief Whip in the Parliament of Ghana.

Early life and education 
Muntaka was born on October 17, 1971 and hails from Akuse in the Eastern Region of Ghana but his parents originally came from the northern part of Ghana in a town called Kumbungu. He is a product of the Kwame Nkrumah University of Science and Technology. He acquired a Masters of Science degree in Development Policy and Planning from the university. This was in 2004.

Career 
Muntaka is a development planner by profession. He was the head of one of the units (RME) of Adwumapa Buyers Limited, a cocoa buying company.

Political career

Member of Parliament 
Muntaka first entered the Parliament of Ghana on the ticket of the National Democratic Congress in 2005 when he won a by-election in the Asawase constituency with a majority of 11,142, replacing the late Dr Gibril Adamu Mohammed also of the NDC who had won the seat in December 2004 with a majority of 4,474. The Ghana Center for Democratic Development deemed this by-election as "fair and transparent, but not free from fear." He subsequently retained his seat in the Ghanaian parliamentary election held in December 2008. He also won the next election in 2012. Muntaka was the Chief Majority Whip in parliament for the NDC caucus, the majority in Government.

Minister for Youth and Sports 
He was the Minister for Youth and Sports in the Ghana government. In January 2009, Mubarak was appointed as Minister-designate for the Youth and Sports Ministry by President John Evans Atta Mills. His appointment was applauded by the National Youth Council due to his youthfulness and youthful exuberance as by the time of his appointment he was 39 years. He served as Minister for Youth and sports until he was made to proceed on a leave while allegations of corruption leveled against him were investigated. However, he resigned from government following the acceptance by President Mills of the findings of the investigating committee. He was replaced subsequently by Dr. Abdul-Rashid Pelpuo.

Committees 
Muntaka is a member of the House Committee, also a member of the Appointments Committee, also a member of the Standing Orders Committee, also a member of the Health Committee, also a member of the Mines and Energy Committee, also a member of the Business Committee and also a member of the Committee of Selection Committee.

Elections 
Muntaka was elected as the member of parliament for the Asawase constituency during the by-elections in 2005 after the death of Dr. Gibril Adamu Mohammed the then Member of Parliament for the Asawase constituency.

In 2008, he won the general elections on the ticket of the National Democratic Congress for the same constituency. His constituency was part of the 3 parliamentary seats out of 39 seats won by the National Democratic Congress in that election for the Ashanti Region. The National Democratic Congress won a majority total of 113 parliamentary seats out of 230 seats. He was elected with 36,557 votes out of 64,443 total valid votes cast equivalent to 56.73% of total valid votes cast. He was elected over Dr. Mohammed Abdul-Kabir of the New Patriotic Party, Elyasu Mohammed of the People's National Convention, Mohammed Bashir Tijani of the Democratic Freedom Party and Alhaji Baba Musah of the Convention People's Party. These obtained 27,168, 371, 86 and 261 votes respectively of the total valid votes cast. This was equivalent to 42.16%, 0.58%, 0.13 and 0.41% respectively of the total votes cast.

In 2012, he won the general elections once again for the same constituency. He was elected with 43,917 votes out of 77,034 total valid votes cast. This was equivalent to 57.01% of total valid votes cast. He was elected over Nana Okyere-Tawiah Antwi of the New Patriotic Party, Jerry Joseph Quayson of the Progressive People's Party, Abdulai Umaru of the People's National Convention, Elias Mohammed of the Convention People's Party, Yakubu Adams Zakaria of the National Democratic Party and Alhassan Abdul Majeed an independent candidate. These obtained 31,013, 458, 267, 251, 182 and 946 votes respectively of the total valid votes cast. These were equivalent to 40.26%, 0.59%, 0.35%, 0.33%, 0.24% and 1.23% respectively of the total votes cast.

Mutaka retain the parliamentary seat in the 2020 general election to represent in the 8th Parliament of the Fourth Republic. He won with 51,659 votes while the NPP parliamentary candidate polled 31,256.

Controversies 
During the 2020 general election, Muntaka was said to have allowed his 6-year-old daughter to thumbprint his ballot on his behalf, an act that attracted wide condemnation as the Ghana electoral laws only permit people above 18 years to participate in elections.

He was requested by President John Atta Mills to proceed on leave while allegations of corruption against him were investigated. He however resigned from government following the acceptance by President Mills of the findings of the investigating committee.

In January 2021, he allegedly said a Supreme Court judge offered an inducement to a female member of parliament of the NDC in an attempt to persuade her to cast a vote for Mike Oquaye during the Speaker of parliament election. He was widely condemned by lawyers and was asked to provide evidences.

Personal life 
Muntaka is married with five (5) children. He is a Muslim.

See also 
Asawase constituency
List of Mills government ministers

References

External links 
 Muntaka Mohammed Mubarak on Parliament of Ghana website

Ghanaian MPs 2005–2009
Ghanaian MPs 2009–2013
Ghanaian MPs 2013–2017
Ghanaian MPs 2017–2021
Sports ministers of Ghana
National Democratic Congress (Ghana) politicians
Ghanaian Muslims
Living people
Dagomba people
Kwame Nkrumah University of Science and Technology alumni
1970 births
Ghanaian MPs 2021–2025
Tamale Senior High School alumni